The 1994–95 Wake Forest Demon Deacons men's basketball team represented Wake Forest University during the 1994–95 men's college basketball season.

Roster

Schedule

|-
!colspan=9 style=| Regular season

|-
!colspan=9 style=| ACC Tournament

|-
!colspan=9 style=| NCAA Tournament

Rankings

Awards and honors
Dave Odom – ACC Coach of the Year

References

Wake Forest Demon Deacons men's basketball seasons
Wake Forest
Wake Forest